The Life Line is a late 19th-century painting by American artist Winslow Homer. Done in oil on canvas, the painting depicts the rescue of a passenger from a stricken ship. The work – one of Homer's most iconic – is in the collection of the Philadelphia Museum of Art.

References 

1884 paintings
Paintings by Winslow Homer
Paintings in the collection of the Philadelphia Museum of Art